Mkuki na Nyota Publishers Ltd (MNP) is a book publishing company that was founded in 1981 in response to the general absence of independent scholarly publishing in Tanzania.  It researches, creates, publishes, markets and sells general books, children's books, trade books and educational books.  Books are published in both English and Kiswahili.  It also translates literature into Kiswahili, including Antoine de Saint-Exupéry's Le Petit Prince from its original French.

Mkuki na Nyota is a member of the African Books Collective, a collective owned and governed by a group of African publishers.

Partnerships
Mkuki na Nyota has published books for and in conjunction with the Economic and Social Research Foundation (ESRF), Research on Poverty Alleviation (REPOA), Research on Democracy in Tanzania (REDET).
Mkuki na Nyota has partnered with Non-governmental organisations to promote reading and education in Tanzania, for example, with Newton Tanzania.

References

External links
 Mkuki na Nyota Official Website

1991 establishments in Tanzania
Academic publishing companies
Communications in Tanzania
Companies of Tanzania
Publishing companies established in 1991